The 2019 Rugby Championship was the eighth edition of the annual southern hemisphere Rugby Championship, featuring Argentina, Australia, South Africa and New Zealand. The competition is operated by SANZAAR, a joint venture of the four countries' national unions.

The tournament schedule was similar to that of the 2015 edition, being shortened due to the World Cup.

New Zealand was the three-time back-to-back defending champions entering this years Championship. However, South Africa claimed their fourth title, their first since the inception of the Rugby Championship and their first Southern Hemisphere title since 2009.	
They became the third team to claim the expanded Southern Hemisphere championship, following New Zealand and Australia.

Background
The tournament is operated by SANZAAR and known for sponsorship reasons as The Castle Rugby Championship in South Africa, The Investec Rugby Championship in New Zealand, The Mitsubishi Estate Rugby Championship in Australia, and The Personal Rugby Championship in Argentina.

Format
Because of the 2019 World Cup, the tournament schedule was reduced, as it was in 2015, to each team playing each other once. Australia and Argentina each played two home matches out of the three matches to be played in total. New Zealand and South Africa had one home fixture. As usual, a win earned a team four league points, a draw two league points, and a loss by eight or more points zero league points. A bonus point was earned in one of two ways: by scoring at least three tries more than the opponent in a match, or by losing within seven points. The competition winner was the side with the most points at the end of the tournament.

Other Cups 
Because the Bledisloe Cup is decided in two home-and-away legs, after the end of the shortened Rugby Championship, New Zealand and Australia played for the Bledisloe Cup decider at Eden Park, Auckland, with Australia leading the series 1-0. New Zealand retained the Cup for the 17th consecutive year with a comprehensive 36-0 win, concluding in a 1-1 series result.

Table

Results

Round 1

Notes:
 Rynhardt Elstadt, Lizo Gqoboka and Herschel Jantjies (all South Africa) and Harry Johnson-Holmes and Isi Naisarani (both Australia) made their international debuts.
 South Africa reclaim the Mandela Challenge Plate.

Notes:
 Mayco Vivas (Argentina) and Braydon Ennor, Luke Jacobson, Atunaisa Moli and Sevu Reece (all New Zealand) made their international debuts.

Round 2

Notes:
 New Zealand retain the Freedom Cup.
 This was the first draw between these two sides since 1994.
 New Zealand passed 16,000 points in international rugby during this game.

Notes:
 Santiago Socino (Argentina) made his international debut.
 Australia retain the Puma Trophy.

Round 3

Notes:
 This was the first Bledisloe Cup match played in Western Australia.	
 Australia's 47 points was their record score against New Zealand, surpassing the 35 points scored in 2000.
 The All Blacks' 21-point defeat equalled their record loss, set in 1999 against Australia.
 New Zealand finished third in the table for the first time since the 2004 Tri Nations, and the first time since The Rugby Championship's inception.	
 Scott Barrett became the fourth New Zealand player to be sent off in an international match, and the first since Sonny Bill Williams against the British and Irish Lions in 2017. Barrett was also the first player to be dismissed in a Bledisloe Cup match since Drew Mitchell in 2010. 
 The crowd of 61,241 was the largest to date to attend a sporting event at Perth Stadium. 

Notes:

 This was South Africa's biggest winning margin over Argentina in Argentina.
 Handré Pollard's tally of 31 points set a new record for a single player in a Rugby Championship match. It equalled Morné Steyn's Tri Nations record, set against New Zealand in 2009.

Statistics

Points scorers

Try scorers

Squads

Note: Ages, caps and clubs/franchises are of 20 July 2019 – the starting date of the tournament

Argentina
On 46-man extended squad for the 2019 Rugby Championship and in preparation for the 2019 Rugby World Cup.

Australia
On 4 July, Michael Cheika named a 34-man squad for the 2019 Rugby Championship.

James O'Connor officially joined the squad on 17 July after the completion of signing a contract with Rugby Australia and the Queensland Reds.

New Zealand
On 2 July 2019, Hansen named a 39-man squad ahead of the 2019 Rugby Championship.

South Africa
The following players were named in the South African squad for the 2019 Rugby Championship:

See also
 History of rugby union matches between Argentina and Australia
 History of rugby union matches between Argentina and New Zealand
 History of rugby union matches between Argentina and South Africa
 History of rugby union matches between Australia and South Africa
 History of rugby union matches between Australia and New Zealand
 History of rugby union matches between New Zealand and South Africa

References

2019 in Argentine rugby union
2019 in Australian rugby union
2019 in New Zealand rugby union
2019 in South African rugby union
2019 rugby union tournaments for national teams
July 2019 sports events in Africa
July 2019 sports events in Australia
July 2019 sports events in New Zealand
July 2019 sports events in South America
August 2019 sports events in Australia
August 2019 sports events in South America
2019